This is a list of North Melbourne Football Club players who have made one or more appearance in the Australian Football League, known as the Victorian Football League until 1990.

North Melbourne Football Club players

1920s

See also
List of North Melbourne Football Club coaches

References
AFL Tables – All Time Player List – North Melbourne
Current listed players
Current rookie listed players

Players

North Melbourne
North Melbourne Football Club players